The 2019 Oyo State gubernatorial election occurred on March 9, 2019, the PDP nominee Seyi Makinde won the election, defeating Adebayo Adelabu of the APC.

Seyi Makinde emerged PDP gubernatorial candidate after scoring 2,772 votes and defeating his closest rival, Ayo Adeseun, who received 21 votes. He picked Rauf Olaniyan as his running mate. Adebayo Adelabu was the APC candidate with Samuel Egunjobi as his running mate. Olufemi Lanlehin was the ADC candidate, while Christopher Alao-Akala stood for ADP. 42 candidates contested in the election.

Electoral system
The Governor of Oyo State is elected using the plurality voting system.

Primary election

PDP primary
The PDP primary election was held on September 30, 2018. Seyi Makinde won the primary election polling 2,772 votes against his closest rival and only opponent, Ayo Adeseun, a former senator in the state who got 21 votes.

Candidates
Party nominee: Seyi Makinde: Businessman
Running mate: Rauf Olaniyan: Retired civil servant
Ayo Adeseun: Former senator

APC primary
The APC primary election was held on September 30, 2018. Adebayo Adelabu, a former deputy governor of central bank of Nigeria emerged unopposed after all the aspirants stepped down for him.

Candidates
Party nominee: Adebayo Adelabu: A former deputy governor of central bank of Nigeria.
Running mate: Samuel Egunjobi
All the aspirants stepped down for the eventual party nominee.

Results
A total number of 42 candidates registered with the Independent National Electoral Commission to contest in the election.

The total number of registered voters in the state was 2,934,107, while 940,211 voters were accredited. Total number of votes cast was 937,545, while number of valid votes was 916,860. Rejected votes were 20,689.

By local government area
Here are the results of the election by local government area for the two major parties. The total valid votes of 916,860 represents the 42 political parties that participated in the election. Green represents LGAs won by Seyi Makinde. Blue represents LGAs won by Adebayo Adelabu.

References 

Oyo
Oyo State gubernatorial elections
Oyo State gubernatorial election